The Citadel Bulldogs football program is a college football team that represents The Citadel, The Military College of South Carolina in the Southern Conference.  The Bulldogs compete in the National Collegiate Athletic Association (NCAA) Division I Football Championship Subdivision.

The first season of football at The Citadel was in 1905.  The team has had twenty-five different head coaches, with two serving for two separate stretches of time.  There was no team from 1943 through 1945 due to World War II.

The Bulldogs have appeared in and won one bowl game, the 1960 Tangerine Bowl under head coach Eddie Teague.  They have also made five appearances in the NCAA Division I-AA (now FCS) Playoffs, holding an overall record of 2–5.  The first three appearances were under head coach Charlie Taaffe, while the others were led by Mike Houston and Brent Thompson.  The Citadel has claimed four Southern Conference championships, in 1961 under the leadership of Teague, in 1992 under Taaffe, in 2015 under Houston, and 2016 under Thompson.  The Bulldogs have not won a national championship in football.

Through the end of the 2018 season, Charlie Taaffe has coached the most games for the Bulldogs, and claimed the most wins.  He and Mike Houston are the only coaches to lead the team and win a game in the Division I-AA playoffs.  Kevin Higgins recorded the most losses in Citadel history and second most games overall, just one behind Taaffe.  After three seasons, Brent Thompson has the highest winning percentage at .588, while John D. McMillan has the lowest winning percentage at .225.

Taaffe earned National Coach of the Year honors in 1992, from Sports Information Directors in the Eddie Robinson Award, The Sports Network, and from the American Football Coaches Association.  Six coaches have earned Southern Conference Coach of the Year honors: Teague (1961), Tom Moore (1984), Taaffe (1988 and 1992), Higgins (2012), Houston (2015), and Thompson (2016).  Additionally, John Sauer and Teague earned South Carolina Coach of the Year awards in 1955 and 1961, respectively.

Key

Coaches

Notes

References

Lists of college football head coaches
Citadel Bulldogs football coaches